Elina Bardach-Yalov is an Israeli politician. She was a member of Knesset for Yisrael Beiteinu.

Political career
Elina Bardach-Yalov was placed tenth on the Yisrael Beiteinu list for the 2021 elections. Although the party won only eight seats, she entered the Knesset on 15 June 2021 as a replacement for Avigdor Lieberman, after he was appointed to the cabinet and resigned from the Knesset under the Norwegian Law.

References

External links

Living people
Members of the 24th Knesset (2021–2022)
Women members of the Knesset
Yisrael Beiteinu politicians
Politicians from Moscow
1982 births